Amadeus is a play by Peter Shaffer which gives a fictional account of the lives of composers Wolfgang Amadeus Mozart and Antonio Salieri, first performed in 1979. It was inspired by Alexander Pushkin's short 1830 play Mozart and Salieri, which Nikolai Rimsky-Korsakov used in 1897 as the libretto for an opera of the same name.

The play makes significant use of the music of Mozart, Salieri and other composers of the period. The premieres of Mozart's operas The Abduction from the Seraglio, The Marriage of Figaro, Don Giovanni, and The Magic Flute are the settings for key scenes. It was presented at the Royal National Theatre, London in 1979, then moved to Her Majesty's Theatre in the West End followed by a Broadway production. It won the 1981 Tony Award for Best Play and Shaffer adapted it for the 1984 film of the same name.

Plot
[Since the play's original run, Shaffer extensively revised his play, including changes to plot details; the following is common to all revisions.]

The composer Salieri is an old man, having long outlived his fame. Speaking directly to the audience, he claims to have used poison to assassinate Mozart and promises to explain himself. The action then flashes back to the eighteenth century, at a time when Salieri has not met Mozart but has heard of him and his music. He adores Mozart's compositions and is thrilled at the chance to meet him, during a salon at which some of Mozart's compositions will be played. But when he finally catches sight of Mozart he is deeply disappointed to find him lacking the grace and charm of his compositions. Mozart is crawling around on his hands and knees, engaging in profane talk with his future bride Constanze Weber.

Salieri cannot reconcile Mozart's boorish behaviour with the genius that God has inexplicably bestowed upon him. A devout Catholic all his life, Salieri cannot believe that God would choose Mozart over him for such a gift. Salieri renounces God and vows to do everything in his power to destroy Mozart as a way of retaliating against his Creator. Salieri pretends to be Mozart's ally to his face while doing his utmost to destroy his reputation and any success his compositions may have. On more than one occasion, only the intervention of Joseph II, Holy Roman Emperor allows Mozart to continue (interventions which Salieri opposes and then is all too happy to take credit for when Mozart assumes it was he who intervened). Salieri humiliates Mozart's wife when she comes to Salieri for aid. He smears Mozart's character with the Emperor and the court. A major theme in Amadeus is Mozart's repeated attempts to win over the aristocratic "public" with increasingly brilliant compositions, which are always frustrated either by Salieri or by the aristocracy's inability to appreciate Mozart's genius. Salieri attempts suicide with a razor in a last attempt to be remembered, leaving a false confession of having murdered Mozart with arsenic. He survives and his confession is met with disbelief, leaving him to wallow once again in mediocrity.

Background and production

Historical accuracy
Shaffer used artistic licence in his portrayals of Mozart and Salieri. Documentary evidence suggests that there may have been some occasional antipathy between the two men but the idea that Salieri was the instigator of Mozart's demise is not taken seriously by scholars of the men's lives and careers. In fact, there is evidence that they enjoyed a relationship marked by mutual respect. As an example, Salieri later tutored Mozart's son Franz in music. He also conducted some of Mozart's works, in Mozart's lifetime and afterwards.

Writer David Cairns called Amadeus "myth-mongering" and argued against Shaffer's portrait of Mozart as "two contradictory beings, sublime artist and fool", positing instead that Mozart was "fundamentally well-integrated". Cairns also rejects the "romantic legend" that Mozart always wrote out perfect manuscripts of works already completely composed in his head, citing major and prolonged revisions to several manuscripts (see: Mozart's compositional method). Mozart scholar H. C. Robbins Landon commented that "it may prove difficult to dissuade the public from the current Schafferian view of the composer as a divinely gifted drunken lout, pursued by a vengeful Salieri. By the same token, Constanze Mozart, she (in the film) of the extraordinary decollete and fatuous giggle, needs to be rescued from Schaffer's view of her".

Notable productions
Amadeus was first presented at the  National Theatre, London in 1979, directed by Sir Peter Hall and starring Paul Scofield as Salieri, Simon Callow as Mozart and Felicity Kendal as Constanze. (Callow appeared in the film version in a different role.) It was later transferred in modified form to Her Majesty's Theatre in the West End, starring Frank Finlay as Salieri. The cast also included Andrew Cruickshank (Rosenberg), Basil Henson (von Strack), Philip Locke (Greybig), John Normington (Joseph II) and Nicholas Selby (van Swieten).

The play premiered on Broadway on 11 December 1980 at the Broadhurst Theatre, with Ian McKellen as Salieri, Tim Curry as Mozart and Jane Seymour as Constanze. It ran for 1,181 performances, closing on 16 October 1983 and was nominated for seven Tony Awards (Best Actor for both McKellen and Curry, Best Director for Peter Hall, Best Play, Best Costume Design, Lighting and Set Design for John Bury), of which it won five (including Best Play and Best Actor for McKellen). In 2015, Curry stated in an interview that the original Broadway production was the favorite stage production that he had ever been in. During the run of the play McKellen was replaced by John Wood, Frank Langella, David Dukes, David Birney, John Horton and Daniel Davis. Curry was replaced by Peter Firth, Peter Crook, Dennis Boutsikaris, John Pankow, Mark Hamill and John Thomas Waite. Also playing Constanze were Amy Irving, Suzanne Lederer, Michele Farr, Caris Corfman and Maureen Moore.

In June 1981, Roman Polanski directed and co-starred (as Mozart) in a stage production of the play, first in Warsaw (with a legendary performance of Tadeusz Łomnicki as Salieri), then at the Théâtre Marigny in Paris with François Périer as Salieri. The play was again directed by Polanski, in Milan, in 1999.

In 1982, Richard Wherrett directed a Sydney Theatre Company production at the Theatre Royal, Sydney. It starred John Gaden as Salieri, Drew Forsythe as Mozart and Linda Cropper as Constanze, with Lyn Collingwood as Mrs Salieri and Robert Hughes as Venticello II. It ran from 6 April to 29 May 1982. Adam Redfield (as Mozart) and Terry Finn (as Constanze) appeared in the 1984 Virginia Stage Company production, at the Wells Theatre in Norfolk, Virginia, directed by Charles Towers. The play was revived in 1999 at the Music Box Theatre, New York City, directed again by Peter Hall and produced by Kim Poster. It ran for 173 performances (15 December 1999 until 14 May 2000), receiving Tony Award nominations for Best Revival and Best Actor in a Play (David Suchet, who played Salieri). Also in the cast were Michael Sheen as Mozart, Cindy Katz as Constanze and David McCallum as Joseph II.

In July 2006, the Los Angeles Philharmonic presented a production of portions from the latest revision of the play at the Hollywood Bowl. Neil Patrick Harris starred as Mozart, Kimberly Williams-Paisley as Constanze Mozart, and Michael York as Salieri. Leonard Slatkin conducted the Philharmonic Orchestra. Rupert Everett played Salieri in a production at the refurbished Chichester Festival Theatre from 12 July through 2 August 2014. The cast included Joshua McGuire as Mozart, Jessie Buckley as Constanze and John Standing as Count Orsini-Rosenberg. Simon Jones played Joseph II. Peter Shaffer attended the play at the closing performance.

The play was revived at the National Theatre in London in a new production directed by Michael Longhurst, from October 2016 to March 2017. It starred Lucian Msamati as Salieri alongside Adam Gillen as Mozart, Karla Crome as Constanze, Hugh Sachs as Count Orsini-Rosenberg and Tom Edden as Joseph II, accompanied with a live orchestra by the Southbank Sinfonia. The production sold out with rave reviews and returned to the Olivier Theatre at the NT with Msamati and Gillen reprising the roles of Salieri and Mozart from February to 24 April 2018, again with rave reviews.

The play was performed at the Estates Theatre, where Don Giovanni was premiered in 1787, and where part of the 1984 film was shot, in 2017 for the first time in English in the Czech Republic, directed by Guy Roberts. Amadeus was directed by Javad Molania in Tehran in March 2018 at Hafez Hall. A new production, scheduled for December 2022 at the Sydney Opera House, was announced in July 2022 with Michael Sheen as Salieri.

Awards and nominations 
 1979 Evening Standard Award for Best Play
 1981 Drama Desk Award for Outstanding New Play
 1981 Tony Award for Best Play

In other media

Radio
In 1983, BBC Radio 3 aired an audio version directed by Sir Peter Hall which starred the original cast of his National Theatre production. The cast included:
 Paul Scofield as Antonio Salieri
 Simon Callow as Wolfgang Amadeus Mozart
 Felicity Kendal as Constanze Mozart
 John Normington as Joseph II, Holy Roman Emperor
 Nicholas Selby as Gottfried van Swieten
 Willoughby Goddard as Count Franz Orsini Rosenberg
 Basil Henson as Johann Killian Von Strack
 Donald Gee, Dermot Crowley as Venticelli
 Nigel Bellairs, Susan Gilmore, Peggy Marshall, Robin Meredith, Anne Sedgwick, William Sleigh, Glenn Williams as Citizens of Vienna

This radio production was re-broadcast on 2 January 2011 as part of Radio 3's Genius of Mozart season. To celebrate Mozart's 250th birthday in 2006, BBC Radio 2 broadcast an adaptation by Neville Teller of Shaffer's play in eight fifteen-minute episodes directed by Peter Leslie Wilde and narrated by F. Murray Abraham as Salieri. This version was re-broadcast 24 May – 2 June 2010 on BBC Radio 7.

Film

The 1984 film adaptation won the Academy Award for Best Picture. In total, the film won eight Academy Awards. It starred F. Murray Abraham as Salieri (winning the Oscar for Best Actor for his performance), Tom Hulce as Mozart (also nominated for Best Actor) and Elizabeth Berridge as Constanze. The play was thoroughly reworked by Shaffer and the film's director, Miloš Forman with scenes and characters not found in the play. While the focus of the play is primarily on Salieri, the film goes further into developing the characters of both composers.

Television series
In November 2022, it was announced that Joe Barton would be adapting Amadeus into a television series.

See also
 Death of Mozart

References

External links
 
 Amadeus at StageAgent.com

1979 plays
Biographical plays about musicians
Plays based on real people
Broadway plays
Drama Desk Award-winning plays
Plays by Peter Shaffer
Tony Award-winning plays
Wolfgang Amadeus Mozart in fiction
Cultural depictions of Wolfgang Amadeus Mozart
Cultural depictions of Antonio Salieri
Cultural depictions of Joseph II, Holy Roman Emperor
Fiction with unreliable narrators
British plays adapted into films